Vösendorf (Central Bavarian: Vesnduaf) is a town in the district of Mödling in the Austrian state of Lower Austria.

Population

References

External links 
 
 

Cities and towns in Mödling District